El Guerrara (also written al-Qarārah or Guerara) is a town and commune, coextensive with El Guerrara District, in Ghardaïa Province, Algeria. According to the 2008 census it has a population of 59,514, up from 48,313 in 1998, with an annual growth rate of 2.1%.

Climate 

El Guerrara has a hot desert climate (Köppen climate classification BWh), with very hot summers and mild winters, and very little precipitation throughout the year.

Transportation 

El Guerrara is on the W33, a regional road between Berriane on the N1 to the west, and the N3 about halfway between Touggourt and Ouargla to the east.

Education 

40% of the population has a tertiary education (the equal highest in the province), and another 80% has completed secondary education. The overall literacy rate is 5%, and is 1% among males and 4% among females.

Localities 
The commune of El Guerrara is composed of three localities:

 Vieux Ksar de El Guerrara
 Quartiers périphériques
 Palmeraie et village socialiste agricole

References 

Neighbouring towns and cities

Communes of Ghardaïa Province
Algeria